Mattie Do is a Laotian American film director. She is Laos's first and only female film director and the first horror film director from Laos.

Career

Chanthaly
Her directorial debut, Chanthaly (2012), was the first horror film written and directed entirely in Laos, as well as the first to be screened at major film festivals outside of Southeast Asia like the 2013 Fantastic Fest.

Dearest Sister
Do's second feature film, Dearest Sister (2016), (Lao: ນ້ອງຮັກ) was chosen to attend the 2014 Cannes Film Festival as part of the La Fabrique des Cinémas du monde program and was selected as the Laotian entry for the Best Foreign Language Film at the 90th Academy Awards, the first time that Laos submitted a film for consideration in this category. It was screened at more than 20 film festivals and was selected by Laos as its first Oscars submission for Best Foreign Language Film.

The Long Walk
Her third feature, The Long Walk (2019), premiered in the Giornate degli Autori section of the 76th Venice International Film Festival. She won Best Director at the 45th Boston-Science Fiction Film Festival.

Filmography
2012: Chanthaly
2016: Dearest Sister
2019: The Long Walk

Personal life
Do was born in Los Angeles, California, to immigrant parents who left Laos during the communist revolution. Do returned to Vientiane in 2010 with her husband to take care of her retired father. She trained originally as a make-up artist and worked on film productions in Europe and America before becoming a consultant to the oldest film company in Laos, Lao Art Media, upon her return in 2010. She, her husband and their dog Mango live in Vientiane, Laos.

References

External links

 
 Mattie Do at Vimeo.com
 Mattie Do at Youtube.com

Living people
Laotian film directors
Laotian women film directors
Year of birth missing (living people)